Heliophanus paulus is a jumping spider species in the genus Heliophanus.  It was first described by Wanda Wesołowska in 1986 and lives in Botswana and Nigeria.

References

Spiders described in 1986
Arthropods of Botswana
Fauna of Nigeria
Salticidae
Spiders of Africa
Taxa named by Wanda Wesołowska